Brian Brendan Wright (born c.1947) is an Irish criminal, involved in fixing horse races by doping more than 20 race horses in 1990, and trafficking tonnes of cocaine from the Escobar Medellin cartel into Great Britain over a period of two years, amassing up to a £600m fortune. Originally based in Britain, he had been out of the country when authorities began arresting members of his organisation (including his own son, Brian Jr and former son in law, Paul Shannon) as the result of a six-year investigation resulting from the capture of a converted fishing trawler, the Sea Mist, after Irish customs officials discovered 599 kg of cocaine while docked at Cork, Ireland in September 1996.

Eventually relocating to northern Cyprus, he purchased a £300,000 villa near occupied Lapithos in the name of a Turkish Cypriot friend and, by 1998, his organization operated freely as the northern Cyprus government is recognized only by Turkey and thus has no extradition treaties with any other country.

In 2002, British authorities announced the capture of a leading member of his organisation, South African drug trafficker Hilton John Van Staden, who eventually pleaded guilty to conspiring to smuggle drugs into the country with customs officials claiming the destruction of Wright's organisation.

In April 2005, he was arrested by police in Sotogrande, Spain and on 2 April 2007 he was found guilty of running one of the most sophisticated and successful cocaine smuggling organisations in the world.

On 2 April 2007, after an 11-year investigation, he was found guilty of running an international cocaine smuggling empire. The following day he was sentenced to 30 years and according to his lawyers, had accepted he will die in prison. Wright was a friend of celebrity comedian Jim Davidson, partly owning one of Davidson's horses.

References

External links
Guardian Unlimited: Silence is golden for drug king by Tony Thompson
Cyprus Mail: Suspected cocaine baron 'hiding in the north'
Trinidad and Tobago News: UK Police Bust Huge Cocaine Smuggling Gang

1940s births
Living people
20th-century criminals
Year of birth missing (living people)
Irish drug traffickers
Irish people imprisoned abroad
People convicted of drug offenses
Prisoners and detainees of England and Wales